Rhodopirellula lusitana is a bacterium from the genus of Rhodopirellula which has been isolated from the Ulva from Carreço in Portugal.

References

Bacteria described in 2014
Planctomycetota